The 1999 NCAA men's volleyball tournament was the 30th annual tournament to determine the national champion of NCAA men's collegiate volleyball. The single elimination tournament was played at Pauley Pavilion in Los Angeles, California during May 1999.

BYU defeated Long Beach State in the final match, 3–0 (15–9, 15–7, 15–10), to win their first national title. The Cougars (30–1) were coached by Carl McGown. BYU won the title in just their first appearance in the NCAA men's volleyball tournament.

BYU's Ossie Antonetti was named the tournament's Most Outstanding Player. Antonetti, along with five other players, comprised the All-Tournament Team.

Qualification
Until the creation of the NCAA Men's Division III Volleyball Championship in 2012, there was only a single national championship for men's volleyball. As such, all NCAA men's volleyball programs, whether from Division I, Division II, or Division III, were eligible. A total of 4 teams were invited to contest this championship.

Tournament bracket 
Site: Pauley Pavilion, Los Angeles, California

All tournament team 
 Ossie Antonetti, BYU (Most outstanding player)
Ryan Millar, BYU
Chris Seiffert, Long Beach State
David McKenzie, Long Beach State
 Jose Quinones, Penn State
Scott Lane, IPFW

See also 
 NCAA Men's National Collegiate Volleyball Championship
 NCAA Women's Volleyball Championships (Division I, Division II, Division III)

References

1999
NCAA Men's Volleyball Championship
NCAA Men's Volleyball Championship
1999 in sports in California
Volleyball in California